Trost Records is a record label located in Vienna.

History 
In the early 1990s, Trost was founded as a tape label, releasing records of Austrian alternative and underground bands, such as Valina,  and Holly May.

In 2011, the sublabel Cien Fuegos was established which primarily releases free jazz re-issues. Moreover, Trost started to closely cooperate with artists like Peter Brötzmann, Mats Gustafsson, Alexander von Schlippenbach.

In 2013, Trost released the five-CD set Long Story Short, featuring recordings from the Wels Unlimited festival held in Austria in November 2011, to celebrate the birthday of Peter Brötzmann. In addition to Brötzmann, the release features the music of Okkyung Lee, Nasheet Waits, Jason Adasiewicz, Keiji Haino, and Dieb13. The release was awarded the Preis der deutschen Schallplattenkritik.

Recently, Trost Records has been collaborating with the Scandinavian free jazz band The Thing (the thing records), the Viennese band Radian (Radian Releases) and the Viennese record label Comfortzone.

Artists

References

External links 
 Bandcamp page
official website of Trost
 official website of Cien Fuegos
 official website of Substance Recordstore

Alternative rock record labels
Austrian record labels
Experimental music record labels